Amachi (written: 天知 or 天地) is a Japanese surname. Notable people with the surname include:

, Japanese singer, songwriter and actress
, Japanese actor and voice actor
, Japanese actor
, Japanese baseball manager

Japanese-language surnames